Aschraf El Mahdioui (born 24 May 1996) is a Dutch professional footballer who plays as a midfielder for Saudi side Al-Taawoun. He previously played for ADO Den Haag, Jong Ajax and AS Trenčín. Besides the Netherlands, he has played in Slovakia, Poland and Saudi Arabia.

Club career

Ajax
El Mahdioui is a youth exponent from Ajax Amsterdam. He made his professional debut with Jong Ajax on 18 September 2015 in an Eerste Divisie game against Go Ahead Eagles. He replaced Abdelhak Nouri after 65 minutes.

ADO Den Haag
On 30 June 2016, it was announced that El Mahdioui had signed a three-year contract with Eredivisie side ADO Den Haag.

AS Trenčín
In June 2017, El Mahdioui signed a three-year contract with AS Trenčín.

Personal life
On 12 March 2015, when El Mahdioui played in the youth academy of Ajax, he was arrested along with teammates Samet Bulut and Zakaria El Azzouzi for assaulting a plainclothed policewoman. The officer suffered shoulder injuries and various bruises. She later filed charges against the three players. A day later, Ajax announced in an official message that they had suspended the players. Later that week, El Azzouzi remained the only suspect in the case. El Mahdioui was allowed to make appearances for the Ajax A1 youth side again after serving a month suspension. As punishment, he had to inform the youth players of Ajax together with Bulut and El Azzouzi.

References

1996 births
Living people
Association football midfielders
Dutch footballers
Dutch expatriate footballers
Footballers from Amsterdam
Dutch sportspeople of Moroccan descent
AFC Ajax players
Jong Ajax players
ADO Den Haag players
AS Trenčín players
Wisła Kraków players
Al-Taawoun FC players
Eredivisie players
Eerste Divisie players
Slovak Super Liga players
Ekstraklasa players
Saudi Professional League players
Expatriate footballers in Slovakia
Expatriate footballers in Poland
Expatriate footballers in Saudi Arabia
Dutch expatriate sportspeople in Slovakia
Dutch expatriate sportspeople in Poland
Dutch expatriate sportspeople in Saudi Arabia